The ENMASA Beta was a Spanish air-cooled radial engine of the 1950s. A copy of the American  Wright R-1820 Cyclone, the Beta was the powerplant of a number of post Spanish Civil War aircraft, including the Spanish version of the Junkers Ju 52 transport, the CASA C-202 Halcón and the Hispano HA-100 trainer.

Specifications (Beta B-4)

See also

References

 Bridgman, Leonard. Jane's All The World's Aircraft 1953-54. London:Jane's, 1953.

1950s aircraft piston engines
Aircraft air-cooled radial piston engines